Ariane is a 1931 German drama film directed by Paul Czinner and starring Elisabeth Bergner, Rudolf Forster and Annemarie Steinsieck. It is an adaptation of the 1920 French novel Ariane, jeune fille russe by Claude Anet. Two alternative language versions The Loves of Ariane and Ariane, jeune fille russe were made at the same time. The film was the inspiration of the 1957 Billy Wilder film Love in the Afternoon. Wilder remembered the film as "touching and funny". It was shot at the Staaken Studios in Berlin. The film's sets were designed by the art directors Erich Zander and Karl Weber. Location shooting took place in Paris.

Plot 
The exiled Russian student Ariane Kusnetzowa passed her Abitur at a high school in Zurich. She decides to travel to Berlin to study. During a visit to the opera, she meets the well-mannered, world-experienced and much older Konstantin Michael, a charming and yet a little cool gentleman and bon vivant. He starts wooing her, and the young and initially shy girl tries to catch up with him by pretending to be a seasoned adventuress who already has some experience with men.

Konstantin makes his point of view clear to Ariane from the start. "I won't be staying here long. One day I will travel and never return. But I would like to spend this short time with you, Ariane Kuznetzowa.” Ariane gets involved in this game in the hope of one day binding this enigmatic man, who has a strong charisma, to her forever. She doesn't want to admit the love she feels for him (yet). After a holiday together in Italy, the day of departure comes. This ends in nothing more than an adventure for Konstantin, and he abandons Ariane without batting an eyelid. A world collapses for the girl. Although deeply hurt, she doesn't show it and acts completely cool when she says goodbye.

Back in Berlin, Ariane considers how she can take revenge on Konstantin for this humiliation. The opportunity arises when he comes to Berlin again and arranges to meet Ariane. When she comes face to face with him, she can't help but confess her love to him in a heated argument. Gradually Konstantin begins to understand. Ariane has decided to end the chapter of Constantine for good. Saying goodbye at the train station. When the train starts to move, Ariane follows along for a while, then the man makes his decision. At the moment when her strength is about to dwindle, Konstantin Michael lifts the girl onto the train. Both drive into a common future.

Cast

References

Bibliography

External links

 Ariane Full movie at the Deutsche Filmothek

1931 films
1930s German-language films
Films of the Weimar Republic
Films directed by Paul Czinner
German romantic drama films
1931 romantic drama films
Films based on French novels
Films based on romance novels
German multilingual films
Nero-Film films
Films set in Paris
Films shot in Paris
German black-and-white films
Films with screenplays by Carl Mayer
Films with screenplays by Paul Czinner
1931 multilingual films
1930s German films
Films shot at Staaken Studios